Jonathan Lo is the principal and founder of J3 Productions, a multidisciplinary design studio and consultancy. He has acted as the former creative director for Pop Life magazine, contributed as a regional editor for ApartmentTherapy.com, and has been featured as an on-air expert on HGTV’s “Small Space Big Style.” Lo is also editor of the design and lifestyle blog, happymundane.com.

References

Living people
Year of birth missing (living people)